Lars Erik Petrus (born 4 November 1960 in Luleå in Sweden) is an accomplished speedcuber.

In 1982, he became the national champion of Sweden, and went on to finish fourth overall at the first official Rubik's Cube World Championships held in Budapest, Hungary. He later published his method, known as the Petrus system, on the Internet. It became a fairly popular method among intermediate and upper-level speedcubers, although its more recent use has diminished considerably due to the increased predominance of methods such as ZZ, Roux, and CFOP. Petrus won the 3x3x3 Fewest Moves category at the 2005 World Championships held in November 2005 at Lake Buena Vista, Florida, USA claiming the US$500 prize. He currently (since 1995) resides in SF Bay Area, California, USA.

The Lars Petrus System
The Petrus System was designed as an alternative to the popular layer-based solutions of the early 1980s. Petrus reasoned that as a solver constructs layers, further organization of the cube's remaining pieces is restricted by what one has already done. In order for a layer-based solution to continue after the first layer had been constructed, the solved portion of the cube would have to be temporarily disassembled while the desired moves were made, then reassembled afterward. Petrus sought to get around this by solving the cube outwards from one corner, leaving him with unrestricted movement on several sides of the cube as he progressed. This method is often used to solve the cube in a fewest-moves solution.

The Method
The system uses seven basic steps to solve a Rubik's Cube.

 Build a 2x2x2 block
 Expand to a 2x2x3 without destroying the 2x2x2 block
 Correct edge orientation (EO)
 Solve two complete layers
 Permute the remaining corners (CP)
 Orient the remaining corners (CO)
 Permute the final edges (EP)

Petrus invented three simple and flexible algorithms to complete the last three steps, which he named Niklas, Sune, and Allan.

While the method stands alone as an efficient system for solving the Rubik's Cube, many modifications have been made over the years to stay on the cutting edge of competitive speedcubing. Many more algorithms have been added to shave seconds off the solution time, and steps 5+6 or 6+7 are often combined depending on the problems each case presents.

External links
Rubik's World Championship 2005 - Official Results
Solving Rubik's Cube for Speed by Lars Petrus
Lars's Official Records - From the World Cube Association website

Swedish speedcubers
1960 births
Living people
Google employees
People from Luleå
Sportspeople from Norrbotten County

sv:Rubiks kub#Petrus-metoden